Novy Shigay (Yañı Şığay) is a rural locality (a village) in Sabayevsky Selsoviet, Buzdyaksky District, Bashkortostan, Russia. The population was 6 as of 2010. There is 1 street.

Geography 
Novy Shigay is located 45 km north of Buzdyak (the district's administrative centre) by road. Tugayevo is the nearest rural locality.

References 

Rural localities in Buzdyaksky District